Heinrich Ehrler (14 September 1917 – 4 April 1945) was a German Luftwaffe military aviator and wing commander during World War II. As a fighter ace, he is credited with 208 enemy aircraft shot down in over 400 combat missions. The majority of his victories were claimed over the Eastern Front, with nine claims over the Western Front which included eight in the Messerschmitt Me 262 jet fighter.

List of aerial victories claimed 
According to US historian David T. Zabecki, Ehrler was credited with 208 aerial victories. While Spick lists Ehrler with 209 aerial victories claimed in an unknown number of combat missions. Of these, ten were claimed over the Western Allies and the remaining 199 on the Eastern Front. Obermaier lists him with 208 aerial victories claimed in over 400 combat missions. Mathews and Foreman, authors of Luftwaffe Aces – Biographies and Victory Claims, researched the German Federal Archives and state that Ehrler was credited with more than 182 aerial victories. This figure includes at least 173 claims made on the Eastern Front and 9 on the Western Front, including seven four-engined bombers and eight victories with the Me 262 jet fighter. However, the authors indicate that the records for JG 5 are incomplete. They speculate that the actual number of confirmed victories could also be as low as 150 to 175.

Victory claims were logged to a map-reference (PQ = Planquadrat), for example "PQ 37 Ost RE-5/6". These sectors were then subdivided into 36 smaller units to give a location area 3 × 4 km in size.

Notes

References

Citations

Bibliography

 
 
 
 
 
 
 
 
 

Aerial victories of Ehrler, Heinrich
Ehrler, Heinrich
Aviation in World War II